Feiyr is a digital music distribution service founded in 2005.

Feiyr offers bands, musicians, record labels and Djs the ability to sell their music through the main international digital retailers.
Feiyr functions as an interface between rights owners / labels and digital retailers (Download, Streaming), e.g. iTunes, Musicload, Amazon, Napster, Djshop, eMusic, Vodafone. 
Feiyr offers non-exclusive deals to musicians and labels who retain full rights to their music.

History 
Feiyr was launched in 2005 by leading European dance distribution company, Djshop. Djshop founder Armin Wirth claims the service was launched "as a direct answer to the needs expressed by artists to sell and promote their music whilst retaining complete control of their own release." Feiyr is the only service worldwide to have a distribution deal with the Big Four record companies to sell their music to some independent dance stores.

Labels distributed by Feiyr 
This is not a complete list.

 Construction Records
 Star 69 records
 Computer Science
 Toolroom Knights
 IFE MUSIC GROUP
 Wireless Music Records
 Illegal Fundz Records
 Biscuit Tin records 
 Gfab Records
 Gix Music
 XL Recordings
 Cubaton
 Freerange Records
 FHS Music Production Label
 Sounds United
 Otherside Records
 Globalized Records
 Vendetta Records
 Attention Records
 Blanco y Negro Music
 Klubbstyle Records
 Sneakerz Muzik
Trap Records Entertainment
 Licramon Records
 Mswt Records
 RRO
 Bass9 Records
 Top Cat Records
 Macpherson Records
 Underground Records

Artists distributed by Feiyr 
This is not a complete list.

 Ex Human
 Star Under Construction
 Peter Rauhofer
 Alan Braxe
 Afrojack
 Vallanto
 Dada Life
 Grace Jones
 Poisonous (aka Peter Wells)
 George Morel
 Gixhouze
 Ian Carey
 Corinna May
 Laidback Luke
 Dieter Nuhr
 Dr. Motte
 Lützenkirchen
 Megaherz
 Josefa Schmid
 Vlada Viola Fabretti
 Dj Pippi
 Bpierre
 Robbie Rivera
 Peter Brown
 Lifelike
 Daisy Dee
 Loona
 Eddie Amador
 Ginuwine
 Layo & Bushwacka!
 LeGmo
 Dirk Mueller
 Rekreapolitan Orchestra
 Julio D
 Incredible Sound
 TopCat

Labels sub-distributed by Feiyr Exclusiv Djshop's 
This is not a complete list.

 Warner Music
 Sony Music
 Emi Music
 David Guetta
 Ministry Of Sound
 Kontor Records
 Ariola
 Jive Records
 Capitol Records

References

External links 

 
 Feiyr official social website

Internet properties established in 2005
Online music stores of Germany
Record label distributors
German companies established in 2005